Gravity brake may refer to:

A type of Check valve typically used in solar water heating systems
A fictional device used to stop a falling elevator in the movie, The Towering Inferno